La Paloma is a small city in the Rocha Department of southeastern Uruguay.

Geography

History
It was founded on 1 September 1874. Its status was elevated to "Pueblo" (village) on 8 November 1939 by the Act of Ley Nº 9.888 and on 18 October 1982 to "Ciudad" (city) by the Act of Ley Nº 15.333. During the 1940s the resort was expanded according to plans designed by Juan Antonio Scasso.

Places of worship
 Parish Church of Our Lady of the Pigeon (Roman Catholic)

Population
In 2011 La Paloma had a population of 3,495 inhabitants
 and 4,633 dwellings.
 
Source: Instituto Nacional de Estadística de Uruguay

References

External links
INE map of La Paloma, La Aguada-Costa Azul and Arachania
Tourist information for La Paloma

Populated places in the Rocha Department
Seaside resorts in Uruguay
Port cities and towns in Uruguay